The 1987 CFL season is considered to be the 34th season in modern-day Canadian football, although it is officially the 30th Canadian Football League season.

CFL News in 1987
The Canadian Football League celebrated the 75th Annual Grey Cup game at BC Place Stadium on Sunday, November 29.

The Canadian Football Network, which was syndicated on Canadian television stations, was created by the league, taking the place of CTV, which ended its partnership with the CFL the previous season. The CFL experimented with their blackout policy by blacking out four televised games in both, Hamilton and Toronto (two in Hamilton and two in Toronto). The cable outlet TSN also began broadcasting the CFL in 1987, gaining the rights to games that had been passed on by CBC and CFN; TSN has aired CFL games ever since, eventually becoming the exclusive broadcaster in 2008. The CFL made money off the CBC and TSN agreements, money that largely covered the startup costs for CFN for the first year.

Game rosters were revised from 35 to 34 that included 19 Non-Imports, 13 Imports and 2 Quarterbacks. The reserve list was increased from three to four. Even with these reductions, all eight remaining CFL teams lost money.

After losing money for three years, Charles Bronfman sold the Concordes to Norm Kimball, who renamed them the Alouettes the previous year to renew interest in the team, but after losing money during the 1986 season, and playing before sparse Olympic Stadium crowds of less than 10,000, he, along with the CFL decided enough was enough, so they decided that the Montreal Alouettes would fold for the second time, this time for good on June 24 (the first week of the regular season), after the team played two preseason games on the road. With the team's demise the CFL revised the season schedule and moved the Winnipeg Blue Bombers to the East Division to balance out the divisions. The Alouettes, however, would return in 1996 when the CFL's American operations ended with the Baltimore Stallions moving to Montreal to become the third and current incarnation of the team.

In January 1987, the league rejected a proposal from Arizona Outlaws owner Bill Tatham to allow the Outlaws, then without a league after the collapse of the United States Football League, to play in the CFL.

The single-elimination Semi-Final/Final playoff format (in use since 1972) that was scrapped last season in favour of the "total point series" format was restored; the crossover playoff format was not revisited until 1997.

Regular season standings

Final regular season standings
Note: GP = Games Played, W = Wins, L = Losses, T = Ties, PF = Points For, PA = Points Against, Pts = Points

Bold text means that they have clinched the playoffs.
BC and Winnipeg have first round byes.

Grey Cup playoffs

The Edmonton Eskimos are the 1987 Grey Cup champions, defeating the Toronto Argonauts 38–36, at Vancouver's BC Place Stadium. This game eventually became the battle of the backups when starters, Matt Dunigan and Gilbert Renfroe became injured leaving backups Damon Allen and Danny Barrett to take over. The Eskimos' Damon Allen (QB) was named the Grey Cup's Most Valuable Player on Offence and Stewart Hill (DE) was named Grey Cup's Most Valuable Player on Defence, while Milson Jones (RB) was named the Grey Cup's Most Valuable Canadian.

Playoff bracket

CFL Leaders
 CFL Passing Leaders
 CFL Rushing Leaders
 CFL Receiving Leaders

1987 CFL All-Stars

Offence
QB – Tom Clements, Winnipeg Blue Bombers
RB – Willard Reaves, Winnipeg Blue Bombers
RB – Gill Fenerty, Toronto Argonauts
SB – Darrell Smith, Toronto Argonauts
SB – Perry Tuttle, Winnipeg Blue Bombers
WR – Brian Kelly, Edmonton Eskimos
WR – Jim Sandusky, BC Lions
C – Rod Connop, Edmonton Eskimos
OG – Roger Aldag, Saskatchewan Roughriders
OG – Dan Ferrone, Toronto Argonauts
OT – Chris Walby, Winnipeg Blue Bombers
OT – Chris Schultz, Toronto Argonauts

Defence
DT – Mike Walker, Hamilton Tiger-Cats
DT – Jerald Baylis, Toronto Argonauts
DE – Greg Stumon, BC Lions
DE – Bobby Jurasin, Saskatchewan Roughriders
LB – James West, Winnipeg Blue Bombers
LB – Tyrone Jones, Winnipeg Blue Bombers
LB – Kevin Konar, BC Lions
CB – Roy Bennett, Winnipeg Blue Bombers
CB – James Jefferson, Winnipeg Blue Bombers
DB – Larry Crawford, BC Lions
DB – Ken Hailey, Winnipeg Blue Bombers
S – Scott Flagel, Winnipeg Blue Bombers

Special teams
P – Hank Ilesic, Toronto Argonauts
K – Dave Ridgway, Saskatchewan Roughriders
ST – Henry "Gizmo" Williams, Edmonton Eskimos

1987 Eastern All-Stars

Offence
QB – Tom Clements, Winnipeg Blue Bombers
RB – Willard Reaves, Winnipeg Blue Bombers
RB – Gill Fenerty, Toronto Argonauts
SB – Darrell Smith, Toronto Argonauts
SB – Perry Tuttle, Winnipeg Blue Bombers
WR – James Murphy, Winnipeg Blue Bombers
WR – Steve Stapler, Hamilton Tiger-Cats
C – Ian Beckstead, Toronto Argonauts
OG – Nick Bastaja, Winnipeg Blue Bombers
OG – Dan Ferrone, Toronto Argonauts
OT – Chris Walby, Winnipeg Blue Bombers
OT – Chris Schultz, Toronto Argonauts

Defence
DT – Mike Walker, Hamilton Tiger-Cats
DT – Jearld Baylis, Toronto Argonauts
DE – Grover Covington, Hamilton Tiger-Cats
DE – Rodney Harding, Toronto Argonauts
LB – James West, Winnipeg Blue Bombers
LB – Tyrone Jones, Winnipeg Blue Bombers
LB – Frank Robinson, Hamilton Tiger-Cats
CB – Roy Bennett, Winnipeg Blue Bombers
CB – James Jefferson, Winnipeg Blue Bombers
DB – Howard Fields, Hamilton Tiger-Cats
DB – Ken Hailey, Winnipeg Blue Bombers
S – Scott Flagel, Winnipeg Blue Bombers

Special teams
P – Hank Ilesic, Toronto Argonauts
K – Dean Dorsey, Ottawa Rough Riders
ST – Darnell Clash, Toronto Argonauts

1987 Western All-Stars

Offence
QB – Roy Dewalt, BC Lions
RB – Gary Allen, Calgary Stampeders
RB – Walter Bender (Canadian football), Saskatchewan Roughriders
SB – Ray Elgaard, Saskatchewan Roughriders
SB – Emanuel Tolbert, Calgary Stampeders
WR – Brian Kelly, Edmonton Eskimos
WR – Jim Sandusky, BC Lions
C – Rod Connop, Edmonton Eskimos
OG – Roger Aldag, Saskatchewan Roughriders
OG – Gerald Roper, BC Lions
OT – John Blain, BC Lions
OT – Hec Pothier, Edmonton Eskimos

Defence
DT – James Curry, Saskatchewan Roughriders
DT – Harold Hallman, Calgary Stampeders
DE – Greg Stumon, BC Lions
DE – Bobby Jurasin, Saskatchewan Roughriders
LB – Dan Bass, Edmonton Eskimos
LB – Glen Jackson, BC Lions
LB – Kevin Konar, BC Lions
CB – Keith Gooch, BC Lions
CB – Harry Skipper, Saskatchewan Roughriders
DB – Larry Crawford, BC Lions
DB – Melvin Byrd, BC Lions
S – Nelson Martin, BC Lions

Special teams
P – Glenn Harper, Calgary Stampeders
K – Dave Ridgway, Saskatchewan Roughriders
ST – Henry "Gizmo" Williams, Edmonton Eskimos

1987 CFL Awards
CFL's Most Outstanding Player Award – Tom Clements (QB), Winnipeg Blue Bombers
CFL's Most Outstanding Canadian Award – Scott Flagel (DS), Winnipeg Blue Bombers
CFL's Most Outstanding Defensive Player Award – Greg Stumon (DE), BC Lions
CFL's Most Outstanding Offensive Lineman Award – Chris Walby (OT), Winnipeg Blue Bombers
CFL's Most Outstanding Rookie Award – Gill Fenerty (RB), Toronto Argonauts
CFLPA's Outstanding Community Service Award – Nick Arakgi (DE), Winnipeg Blue Bombers
CFL's Coach of the Year – Bob O'Billovich, Toronto Argonauts

References 

CFL
Canadian Football League seasons